La Salle University Ozamiz (LSUO or La Salle Ozamiz) is a private Catholic Lasallian coeducational basic and higher education institution run by the Philippine District of the Christian Brothers in Ozamiz City, Misamis Occidental Philippines. It is a member of De La Salle Philippines, a network of Lasallian educational institutions within the Lasallian East Asia District.

It was formally opened in 1929 by the Society of Jesus as Immaculate Conception School (ICS) and later renamed Immaculate Conception College (ICC). The De La Salle Brothers took over the administration of the school in 1994 and renamed the school as Immaculate Conception College - La Salle (ICC-La Salle). It was granted university status in 2006 and was renamed La Salle University.

History 
The history of La Salle Ozamiz dates back to the establishment of a parochial school in 1789 within the Parish of the Immaculate Conception. The school was established by the Recollect parish priest, Fr. Constancio Arsenio, OAR, with the first classes being the Cartilla, the Misterio, the Trisagio'', and the Novena.

In 1929, as the Jesuit priests replaced the Recollects, Fr. Gabriel Font SJ formally established the Immaculate Conception School.  Its first teachers were Mr. Juan Fuentes and his sister, Cirila and thirty students registered.  In 1935, the government officially recognized the school's elementary program.

In 1939, the priests of the Missionary Society of St. Columban took over the administration from the Jesuits.  Fr. Peter Fallon, SSC became the first Director of the Immaculate Conception School and that year witnessed the first graduation.

In 1941, the Columban Sisters were invited by Bishop James Hayes and the Columban Fathers to administer the school.  The sisters then opened the high school department. However, World War II broke out and classes had to be discontinued and the old convent, which was used as a school building was converted into a Japanese headquarters.

After the war, classes were resumed and enrollment increased.  For the first time, lay faculty members were employed and more Columban Sisters arrived.  In 1948, the High School Department held its first Commencement Exercises and in June of that year, Mother Mary Theopane opened the college department with an enrollment of eighteen students.

In 1987, at the request of the Columban Sisters, Most Rev. Federico Escaler, S.J., D.D. became the President of Immaculate Conception College.  In 1990, the De La Salle Brothers agreed to assist in the academic supervision of the school with Br. Martin Simpson FSC, as consultant.  He was named President in 1993.

Turnover to the De La Salle Brothers 
On May 17, 1994, the Columban Sisters formally turned over the College to the De La Salle Brothers.  Dr. Emma Villaseran served as the acting President until March 31, 1995, under Br. Benildo Feliciano FSC, who was Chairman of the Board of Trustees. On April 1, 1995, Dr. Villaseran, assumed the position as President.

In 1995 the Philippine Accrediting Association of Schools, Colleges and Universities (PAASCU) accredited the College and was designated by the Commission on Higher Education as a Center of Excellence for Teacher Education in Region X.

On September 14, 2006, upon the establishment of De La Salle Philippines, the College officially became a District school.  Br. Jimmy Dalumpines FSC is La Salle University's current President.

Colleges 
 College of Arts and Sciences
 College of Business and Accountancy
 College of Teacher Education
 College of Computer Studies, Engineering and Architecture 
 School of Tourism and Hospitality Management

Integrated School 
Pre-School (Playgroup, Nursery and Universal Kindergarten)
Lower Grades (Grade 1 - 6)
Higher Grades (Grade 7 - 12)

Lycée Saint John - Baptist De La Salle Senior High 
 Senior High School (Grade 11 and 12)
 Tracks offered are:
 Academic Track:
 Science, Technology, Engineering and Mathematics (STEM)
 Accountancy, business, and Management (ABM)
 Humanities and Social Sciences (HUMSS)
 General Academic Strand (GA)
 Technical-Vocation and Livelihood Track
 Home Economics
 Information and Communications Technology
 Arts and Design Track

Br. Martin Section (BMS) 
Pre-School (Nursery and Universal Kindergarten)
Lower Grades (Grade 1 - 6)
Higher Grades (Grade 7 - 10)

School for the Deaf 
 Lower Grades (Grade 1 - 6)
 Higher Grades (Grade 7 - 10)

Night High School 
Higher Grades (Grade 7 - 10)

Radio station 
The university has its own radio station, 94.5 LSU FM.

References

External links 
La Salle University (Ozamiz) Official Website
La Salle University Official Facebook account
La Salle University Official Twitter account

Ozamiz
Universities and colleges in Misamis Occidental
Education in Ozamiz